Double Happiness may refer to:

 Double Happiness (album), a 2005 album by Australian musician Jimmy Barnes
 Double Happiness (TV series), a Chinese drama series produced in Singapore
 Double Happiness (film), a 1994 movie starring Sandra Oh
 Double Happiness (book), a photobook by Chien-Chi Chang
 Double Happiness (cigarette), a brand of cigarettes in China
 Double Happiness (company), a brand of athletic equipment (specialty in table tennis) in China
 Double Happiness (calligraphy), a Chinese calligraphic character 囍
 Double Happiness, 1996 album by the band Slow Gherkin